A list of massacres that have occurred in Jamaica:

Jamaica
Massacres

Massacres